Hoeggen Church is a parish church of the Church of Norway in Trondheim municipality in Trøndelag county, Norway. It is located in the Lerkendal area in the city of Trondheim. It is one of the churches for the Nidelven parish which is part of the Strinda prosti (deanery) in the Diocese of Nidaros. The tan brick church was built in a long church style in 1997 using plans drawn up by the architectural firm Madsø Sveen. The church seats about 430 people.

History
The new parish of Hoeggen was established in 1979 when it was separated from the large Strinda Church parish. The congregation first rented a room at the Utleira school and then later at the Hoeggen school. In 1987, the congregation bought an old barracks building to use as an interim church on the road Nordre Risvolltun. In the late 1990s, the congregation hired the architecture firm Madsø Sveen to design a permanent church. The new church was completed in 1997. It was consecrated on 12 October 1997.

Media gallery

See also
List of churches in Nidaros

References

Churches in Trondheim
Churches in Trøndelag
Long churches in Norway
Brick churches in Norway
20th-century Church of Norway church buildings
Churches completed in 1997
1979 establishments in Norway